The Cabinet is an Australian television program, which premiered on 18 August 2014 on Sky News Australia. The program sees two former Labor Party politicians Kristina Keneally and Craig Emerson discuss political issues of the week with two former Liberal Party politicians Peter Reith and Helen Coonan.

The program is notable for not having an anchor or moderator, as the four commentators control the debate themselves and take turns throwing to commercial breaks throughout the program.

The program airs sporadically as a fill-in program on Sky News, and doesn't have a permanent weekly timeslot. Peter Beattie filled in for Keneally on an episode which aired on 2 April 2015.

Despite no official confirmation of the program's cancellation, it has not aired after 2015.

References

External links
Sky News Official site

Sky News Australia
Australian non-fiction television series
English-language television shows
2014 Australian television series debuts